Roger Vose (February 24, 1763 - October 26, 1841) was a United States representative from New Hampshire.  He was born in Milton, Massachusetts. He moved to New Hampshire in 1766 with his parents, who settled near Walpole. He graduated from Harvard University in 1790. After graduation, he studied law and was admitted to the bar in 1793 and commenced practice.

Vose was a member of the New Hampshire Senate in 1809, 1810, and 1812. He was elected as a Federalist to the Thirteenth and Fourteenth Congresses (March 4, 1813 – March 3, 1817). Later, he served as member of the New Hampshire House of Representatives in 1818. He was chief justice of the court of common pleas 1818-1820 and the chief justice of the court of sessions 1820–1825. He then resumed the practice of law. He died in Walpole, New Hampshire in 1841 and was buried in the Village Cemetery.

References

1763 births
1841 deaths
People from Milton, Massachusetts
Harvard University alumni
Federalist Party members of the United States House of Representatives from New Hampshire
Members of the New Hampshire House of Representatives
New Hampshire state court judges
New Hampshire state senators